Houra Merrikh is an Iranian-American microbiologist. She is a full professor at Vanderbilt University in the Department of Biochemistry. Her field of work is antibiotic resistance and bacterial evolvability.

Early life and education 
Merrikh was born in Iran and fled the country during the Iran-Iraq War, she was raised in Turkey. At age 16, she was sent to Texas to continue her education. She naturalized as a citizen of the United States in 2003. After attending community college in Texas, she enrolled at the University of Houston and later Boston University.

She obtained a M.S. degree in 2006 and a Ph.D. in 2009 from Brandeis University, and worked with biologist Susan Lovett. She was a National Institutes of Health (NIH) postdoctoral fellow at the Massachusetts Institute of Technology (MIT) from 2009 until 2011.

Career 
In 2009, she was appointed Assistant Professor of Microbiology in the Department of Health and Sciences at the University of Washington. In 2015, she discovered a bacterial protein called Mutation Frequency Decline (Mfd) quickens the bacterial mutation process. In January 2019, she was appointed full Professor in the Department of Biochemistry at Vanderbilt University.

Her work researches ways to slow the rate of bacterial mutations and to block their evolution. In 2017, she led the research group to help bacteria survive hostile environments and resist antibiotics, done through disrupting DNA replication in order to boost the rate of gene mutations.

Honors and awards 
Merrikh is one of the recipients of the 2013 National Institutes of Health (NIH) Director’s New Innovator Awards, for investigating the impact of replication-transcription conflicts on bacterial evolution. She received the Vilcek Foundation, 2016 Vilcek Prize for Creative Promise in Biomedical Science, and the University of Washington Innovation Award in 2015 for her research on the impact of replication-transcription conflicts on antibiotic resistance development.

Publications 
Her most cited publications after the award of her doctorate are, according to Google Scholar:
  (Cited 132 times)

References

External links 
 Merrikh Lab at Vanderbilt University
 Houra Merrikh profile at the Department of Biochemistry, Vanderbilt University
 Houra Merrikh's profile at the Department of Microbiology, University of Washington
 Merrikh, H. articles from National Center for Biotechnology Information, U.S. National Library of Medicine
 Podcast: It's in the Genes with Houra Merrikh  episode 13, from Everything You Know is Wrong
 Video: Houra Merrikh 2016 Vilcek Prize for Creative Promise in Biomedical Science (2016) from Vilcek Foundation

Year of birth missing (living people)
Living people
Iranian microbiologists
American microbiologists
American women biologists
Women microbiologists
Iranian women scientists
Iranian expatriates in Turkey
Boston University alumni
University of Houston alumni
Brandeis University alumni
Iranian emigrants to the United States
People with acquired American citizenship
21st-century American women scientists
21st-century American biologists
Vanderbilt University faculty
University of Washington faculty
American people of Iranian descent